Kapeta is a village in central Malawi on Lake Malawi.

External links
Satellite map at Maplandia.com

Lake Malawi
Populated places in Central Region, Malawi